Rhodothyrsus is a plant genus of the family Euphorbiaceae, first described as a genus in 1999. It is native to South America.

Species
 Rhodothyrsus hirsutus Esser - Colombia, NW Venezuela
 Rhodothyrsus macrophyllus (Ducke) Esser - Guyana, Suriname, Colombia, Peru, N Brazil

References

Flora of South America
Hippomaneae
Euphorbiaceae genera